Mack Daddy is the third album by Sir Mix-a-Lot. It was released on February 4, 1992, on Def American Recordings. The album is particularly notable for the hit single "Baby Got Back."

Track listing
All songs written by Sir Mix-a-Lot, except where noted.
 "One Time's Got No Case" 4:17 (Mix-a-Lot, Wonder)
 "Mack Daddy" 4:22
 "Baby Got Back" 4:21
 "Swap Meet Louie" 4:31
 "Seattle Ain't Bullshittin'" 5:33
 "Lockjaw" 4:19
 "The Boss Is Back" 4:15
 "Testarossa" 5:08 (Mix-a-Lot, I. Hamid, T. Will)
 "A Rapper's Reputation" 5:02
 "Sprung on the Cat" 4:30
 "The Jack Back" 4:56 (Mix-a-Lot, Wicked One)
 "I'm Your New God" 4:43
 "No Holds Barred" 4:05 (Mix-a-Lot, Slave)

Note: A typo across many digital providers has "Seattle" written as "Seatlle" for the title of Seattle Ain't Bullshittin.

SamplesOne Time's Got No Case"You Haven't Done Nothin'" by Stevie Wonder
"Hot Pants (Bonus Beats)" by Bobby ByrdBaby Got Back"Technicolor" by Channel OneLockjaw"There Was a Time" by James Brown
"Zero Bars (Mr. Smith)" by Tubeway Army
"Housequake" by PrinceA Rapper's Reputation"Head" by PrinceThe Jack Back"Sport" by Lightnin' RodNo Holds Barred'
"Funky Drummer" by James Brown
"Baby Sinister" by Slave

Personnel
Sir Mix-a-Lot: Vocals, Keyboards, Drum Programming
Michael Powers: Guitars On Tracks 2, 4, & 12
Eugenius – producer, arranger, programming
Punish: Scratching On Track 6
Amy Dorsey: Female Vocals On Tracks 3 & 4
The Wicked One: Additional Vocals On Track 11

Production
Executive Producer: Rick Rubin
Arranged By Sir Mix-a-Lot
Produced By Sir Mix-a-Lot & Rick Rubin, with co-production by Nate Fox (tracks 1 & 7) and Strange (tracks 8–10 & 12)
Engineered & Mixed By Sir Mix-a-Lot

Charts

Weekly charts

Year-end charts

Certifications

References

1992 albums
Sir Mix-a-Lot albums
American Recordings (record label) albums
Albums produced by Rick Rubin
Reprise Records albums